Mira is an unincorporated community in Caddo Parish, Louisiana, United States.

Notes

Unincorporated communities in Caddo Parish, Louisiana
Unincorporated communities in Louisiana